The Essential Eddy Arnold is a twenty track compilation by country musician Eddy Arnold, released in 1996. AllMusic's Thom Owens says that this album is "the only single-disc retrospective that offers a reasonably thorough overview of his hit singles"

Track listing

Track information and credits taken from the album's liner notes.

References

External links
Country Music Hall of Fame Official Site
RCA Records Official Site
Country Music Hall of Fame Official Site

Eddy Arnold albums
1996 compilation albums
RCA Records compilation albums